John Rudd (Yorkshire c. 1498 – Durham 1579) was a Tudor cartographer and clergyman.

In 1561 he was given two years' leave from his duties as Vicar of Dewsbury (1554-1570) and Rector of Thornhill (1558-1570/78) to travel the country with the objective of mapping England. Although he does not appear to have completed this objective, it was completed by his apprentice, Christopher Saxton.  Saxton was employed by Rudd as a servant and it seems likely that he accompanied him on these trips, and learned draughting and surveying skills from his master.

As well as various benefices, Rudd held a prebend at Durham. He and his wife Isabel (whom he had to renounce during Mary's reign) had at least three daughters and three sons, of whom John (1568-1640) followed his father in ministry. After becoming embroiled in controversy at Cambridge, leading to an appearance before the High Commission, the younger John settled down as Vicar of Shephall (near Stevenage) in Hertfordshire, where his memorial takes the form of a map cartouche, with a depiction of him as the Good Shepherd, brandishing a very episcopal-looking crook! He left bequests to Durham Cathedral School and various churches in Durham and Hertfordshire.

External links
British Library Online Gallery

1490s births
1579 deaths
English cartographers
16th-century English Anglican priests
Clergy from Yorkshire
16th-century cartographers